Thomas Hussey (c. 1520 – by 1576) was an English gentleman and landowner, serving from time to time as a member of the Parliament of England.

He was a Member (MP) of the Parliament of England for Peterborough in 1558, St Ives in 1559, Weymouth in 1571 and Weymouth and Melcombe Regis in 1572.

References

1520 births
16th-century deaths
Members of the pre-1707 English Parliament for constituencies in Cornwall
English MPs 1558
English MPs 1559
English MPs 1571
English MPs 1572–1583